Claiborne Jay Walker (September 21, 1899 – April 26, 1927) was an American fencer. He competed in the individual and team sabre events at the 1920 Summer Olympics. A graduate of the United States Naval Academy in 1917, Walker committed suicide by shooting himself aboard the destroyer  in Shanghai in 1927.

References

External links
 

1899 births
1927 suicides
American male sabre fencers
Olympic fencers of the United States
Fencers at the 1920 Summer Olympics
Sportspeople from Brooklyn
United States Naval Academy alumni
United States Navy officers
Suicides by firearm in China